Ian Graham (1923–2017) was a British Mayanist.

Ian Graham may also refer to:
Ian Graham (footballer, born 1943), Australian rules footballer for Collingwood
Ian Graham (footballer, born 1940), Australian rules footballer for Essendon
Ian A. Graham (born 1963), professor of biology at the University of York
Ian Graham (cricketer) (born 1968), English cricketer
Ian Graham (snooker player)

See also
Ian Maxtone-Graham (born 1959), American television producer and writer

Graham (surname)